Hovinen is a Finnish surname. Notable people with the surname include:

Miro Hovinen (born 1992), Finnish ice hockey player
Niko Hovinen (born 1988), Finnish ice hockey player
Seppo Hovinen (born 1951), Finnish javelin thrower

See also
Huovinen

Finnish-language surnames